The 2007 Afro-Asian Cup of Nations, officially called AFC Asia/Africa Challenge Cup was played between the winners of the 2004 AFC Asian Cup Japan and the winners of the 2006 Africa Cup of Nations Egypt. The competition returned after 10 years, the previous edition was held in 1997. It was held into one leg in Japan.

Qualified teams

Match details

Winners

References

External links
2007 Afro-Asian Cup of Nations - rsssf.com

Afro-Asian Cup of Nations
Afro-Asian Cup of Nations
Mer
Mer
2007–08 in Egyptian football
2007 in Japanese football
Japan national football team matches
Egypt national football team matches
International association football competitions hosted by Japan
October 2007 sports events in Asia